"Clito" is a song by Italian rapper and singer Madame. It was released on 6 November 2020 by Sugar Music and was included in her debut album Madame.

Description
The song is dedicated to the clitoris, and was described as a provocative "feminist manifesto". According to Jessica Mandalà of hip-hop magazine Rapologia, the song is about "the helplessness that we have all felt at least once in front of events that cannot be controlled."

Commenting on the lyrics, Madame said: "it's like life is fucking me and killing me. I represented my suffering as painters do"; she also stated that "it is right for a young girl to understand that even women can talk about everything, with a musical genre that allows them to do so".

Track listing

Charts

References

2020 songs
2020 singles
Madame (singer) songs
Sugar Music singles